Odo II (1118 – June 27 or September 27, 1162) was Duke of Burgundy between 1143 and 1162.

Family 
Odo was the eldest son of Hugh II, Duke of Burgundy and Matilda of Mayenne, daughter of Gauthier, Count of Mayenne and Adelina de Presles. Odo married Marie, daughter of Theobald II, Count of Champagne and Matilda of Carinthia. Odo had three children:
 Alix (1146–1192), married in 1164 to Archambaud (died 1169), son of Archambaud VII (died 1171), Lord of Bourbon
Hugh III, Duke of Burgundy, his successor in the duchy
 Mahaut (died 1202), married Robert IV, Count of Auvergne

Ancestry

References

Sources

|-

House of Burgundy
Dukes of Burgundy
Eudes II, Duke of Burgundy
Eudes II, Duke of Burgundy